WSFN (790 AM) is a sports radio station in Brunswick, Georgia. WSFN programming is simulcast on WFNS 1350 AM and W279BC 103.7 FM. Southern Media Interactive LLC also owns WSEG at Savannah and WFNS at Blackshear.

The station lineup includes Keyshawn, JWill and Zubin, Bob Stevens, Dan Le Batard, The Barb Meade Football Show, ESPN Game Night, and Sports Overnight America, in addition to the Atlanta Braves programming.

Founded on June 1, 1998, "The Fan" SportsRadio 790 WSFN was the first and only full-time, 24-hour all-sports radio station serving Brunswick and The Golden Isles. "The Fan" was one of the highest debuting sports stations in America and is the number one all-sports station of Georgia.

In March 2013, Southern Media Interactive, LLC acquired WSFN, WFNS and WSEG and created the Southern Pigskin Radio Network broadcasting all five AM/FM stations into the Brunswick, Savannah, Hilton Head markets.

The station is an affiliate of the Atlanta Braves radio network, the largest radio affiliate network in Major League Baseball.

On September 4, 2022, it was announced that Shanks Broadcasting will acquire WSFN and will begin carrying the company's "Sports Superstations" network.

References

External links
ESPN Coastal Georgia Facebook

SFN
Sports radio stations in the United States
1966 establishments in Georgia (U.S. state)
Radio stations established in 1966